Sinja Leemann (born 19 April 2002) is a Swiss ice hockey player for ZSC Lions and the Swiss national team.

She represented Switzerland at the 2019 IIHF Women's World Championship.

References

External links

2002 births
Living people
Swiss women's ice hockey forwards
Olympic ice hockey players of Switzerland
Ice hockey players at the 2022 Winter Olympics